KWLM (1340 AM, "News/Talk 1340 AM & 96.3 FM") is an American radio station licensed to serve the community of Willmar, Minnesota, since 1940. The station was assigned the call sign "KWLM" by the Federal Communications Commission (FCC).

The station's broadcast license is held by Lakeland Broadcasting Company. KWLM is one of four stations in the Lakeland Broadcasting Group, which includes KLFN ("106.5 The Train"), KOLV ("Big Country 100.1"), and KQIC ("Q102").

Programming
KWLM broadcasts a news/talk radio format. On-air personalities include Bill Dean, Todd Bergeth, and J.P. Cola. The station airs Minnesota Timberwolves NBA basketball and Willmar High School sporting events.

Alumni
Jack Lynch served the community for nearly 50 years as an on-air personality for KWLM. In addition, Lynch served on hospital and school boards as well as serving as mayor of Willmar from 1973 until 1976. Lynch died in 1999.

Translators
KWLM programming is also carried on two broadcast translator stations to extend or improve the coverage area of the station.

References

External links
KWLM official website
Lakeland Broadcasting Company
Linder Farm Network

 
 

Radio stations in Minnesota
News and talk radio stations in the United States
Radio stations established in 1940
Kandiyohi County, Minnesota
1940 establishments in Minnesota